A handjob, also spelled hand job, is a sex act, performed as either foreplay or as non-penetrative sex, that involves the manual stimulation of the penis or scrotum by another person to induce an erection for sexual pleasure, sexual arousal and sometimes resulting in orgasm and ejaculation.

A handjob can be sexually arousing for both participants and may be an erotic and physically intimate act of its own. 
It is analogous to fingering (stimulation of the vagina).
A person may give a male partner a handjob so as not to engage in penetrative sexual activity. Besides avoiding the risks associated with sexual penetration, such as sexually transmitted infections (STIs) or pregnancy from penile-vaginal sex, some people engage in non-penetrative sex to preserve virginity.

Prevalence in massage parlors

In some massage parlors, a masseuse, whether as part of the massage itself or directly after it, may perform a handjob on their customer; this is sometimes known by the euphemism  "happy ending".

An investigation by Time Out New York in January 2011 found many New York City massage parlors advertising "sensual massage" and providing handjobs. The parlors charged from $60 to $160, with an extra tip for the sex workers (usually $40) for a massage and manual "happy ending". Most of the massage parlors reviewed were "rub and tug joints" where handjobs were the only sexual services provided, and there was a strict policy of the male clients not touching the female workers.

See also

Fellatio
Fingering (sexual act)
Footjob
Hand fetishism
Non-penetrative sex

References

  
 
 "In all I read sixty-five sex advice books...I also looked at a large number of newspaper problem pages and websites. My colleagues...studied sex-related TV documentaries and magazine articles.[...]On average around 17% of the books I looked at were dedicated to PIV [penis-in-vagina] intercourse, compared to...4% on manual sex (using hands)"
 
 
 "Great sex without intercourse", NVSH (contains graphics of sexual acts)

Sexual acts
Masturbation
Male masturbation
Erotic massage
Non-penetrative sex